The construction industry in the United States is one of the major sectors of the country's economy.  there are over 745,000 general contractor LLCs employing over 7.6 million in its workforce, putting up almost US$1.4 trillion worth of structures annually.

Workforce 
In 2006 unauthorized immigrants comprised 12% of the workforce.

Pest treatment 
Termites are a constant threat here, as they are in much of the world. New construction here often requires pre- or post- treatment or both.

See also 
 Associated General Contractors of America

References

External links 
 

Construction industry of the United States